Rweideh, Idlib  is a Syrian village located in Al-Tamanah Nahiyah in Maarrat al-Nu'man District, Idlib.  According to the Syria Central Bureau of Statistics (CBS), Rweideh, Idlib had a population of 920 in the 2004 census.

References 

Populated places in Maarat al-Numan District